Volodymyr Timofiyovich Ivanov (born 10 September 1940) is a Ukrainian former volleyball player who competed for the Soviet Union in the 1968 Summer Olympics.

He was born in the Gomel, Byelorussian SSR.

In 1968, he was part of the Soviet team which won the gold medal in the Olympic tournament. He played eight matches.

External links
 
 

1940 births
Living people
Soviet men's volleyball players
Ukrainian men's volleyball players
Olympic volleyball players of the Soviet Union
Volleyball players at the 1968 Summer Olympics
Olympic gold medalists for the Soviet Union
Sportspeople from Gomel
Olympic medalists in volleyball
Medalists at the 1968 Summer Olympics